Kihi Ngatai  (3 July 1930 – 1 August 2021) was a New Zealand Māori leader. He served as a member of the Waitangi Tribunal.

In the 2006 Queen's Birthday Honours, Ngatai received the Queen's Service Medal for public services.

References

1930 births
2021 deaths
New Zealand Māori people
Recipients of the Queen's Service Medal
Members of the Waitangi Tribunal